Sir John Langton (c. 1387 – 17 March 1459), of Mowthorpe and Farnley, Yorkshire, was an English Member of Parliament in 1420 for Yorkshire.

References

1380s births
1459 deaths
Year of birth uncertain
People from Ryedale (district)
English MPs 1420
Members of the Parliament of England for constituencies in Yorkshire